Bars of Iron is a 1920 British silent drama film directed by F. Martin Thornton and starring Madge White, Rowland Myles and Joseph R. Tozer. It was based on a 1916 novel The Bars of Iron by Ethel M. Dell.

Cast
 Madge White as Avery Denys  
 Rowland Myles as Piers Evesham  
 Joseph R. Tozer as Dr. Lennox Tudor 
 Leopold McLaglen as Eric Denys  
 Olga Conway as Ina Rose  
 Eric Lankester as Sir Beverley Evesham  
 Sydney Lewis Ransome as Rev. Lorimer  
 Gertrude Sterroll as Mrs. Lorimer 
 Gordon Webster as Dick Guyes  
 J. Edwards Barker as Crowther

References

Bibliography
 Goble, Alan. The Complete Index to Literary Sources in Film. Walter de Gruyter, 1999.

External links

1920 films
1920 drama films
British drama films
British silent feature films
1920s English-language films
Films directed by Floyd Martin Thornton
Films set in England
Films set in Australia
Films based on works by Ethel M. Dell
Films based on British novels
British black-and-white films
Stoll Pictures films
1920s British films
Silent drama films